was a monthly manga anthology magazine in Japan, founded by Katsuichi Nagai and published by Seirindō from 1964 until 2002. It was fundamental for the emergence and development of alternative and avant-garde manga.

History
Katsuichi Nagai founded Garo in July 1964 in order to publish the work of gekiga artists who didn't want to work for mainstream manga magazines after the demise of the rental book industry (kashihon). The magazine offered artists artistic freedom, but didn't pay them any salaries. Nagai particularly wanted to promote Marxist gekiga artist Sanpei Shirato's work, naming the magazine after one of Shirato's ninja characters. The first series published in Garo was Shirato's drama Kamui explored themes of class struggle and anti-authoritarianism around a Burakumin ninja boy with an Ainu name. Nagai originally intended the magazine to be for elementary and middle school children to become educated about antimilitarism and direct democracy, publishing essays against the Vietnam War and the rise of the price of school lunch alongside manga. Eventually it became a hit with college students instead. Garo attracted several influential gekiga artists such as Yoshihiro Tatsumi and Yoshiharu Tsuge, and discovered and promoted many new artists.

From 1965 on and especially from 1967 on, the magazine published more and more manga with unconventional form and themes. At the same time, the magazine abandoned its political education project and, while manga published in the magazine stayed critical of militarism and corporate greed, serializations became increasingly "little committed to social change" according to Ryan Holmberg. Garo circulation at the peak of its popularity in 1971 was over eighty thousand. The magazine was politically affiliated with the Zengakuren and had a big following among the left-wing student movement.

During the 1970s and 1980s its popularity declined. By the mid-1980s its circulation was barely over twenty thousand, and its demise was rumored to be imminent. Nagai managed to keep it going independently until 1991, when it was bought out by a game software company. Although a new, young president was installed and advertisements for computer games (based on stories featured in Garo) started to run in the magazine, Nagai was kept on board as chairman until his death in 1996.

After being bought out by a new owner, here were allegations of the anthology taking a more commercial path. Eventually authors who were regular to Garo went their own ways and founded other anthologies like Ax. Garo is no longer being published.

Style and themes
Over the years, Garo went through many artistic phases, including Shirato's leftist samurai dramas, abstract art and surrealism, erotic/grotesque, and punk.

Sharon Kinsella writes that the magazine explored "the realm of dreams, collective memories and social psychology" and that its manga were "characterized by obscure and typically nihilistic vignettes about individuals living on the fringes of modern society." She cites Yoshiharu Tsuge's Screw Style as an example.

The early period of the magazine saw manga inspired by "kamishibai paper theatre of the [1940s and 1950s], rental kashihon manga of the late [1950s] and early [1960s], children’s illustrated fiction from the 1930s and [1940s], pre-modern travel literature and Buddhist parables, and Japanese folklore and ghost stories". Ryan Holmberg calls this period traditionalist.

The magazine was considered too specialist to be clearly identified with one of the four classic manga categorizations shōjo manga, shōnen manga, josei manga and seinen manga.

Legacy 
For much of its existence, Garo was the premiere showcase for "art" manga in Japan. It was popular enough during its heyday to inspire several imitators, including COM, founded by manga legend Osamu Tezuka, Comic Baku and Comic Are. Because Garo was the artistic center of alternative manga production for decades, alternative manga in Japan are often called Garo-kei (ガロ系), even if they were not published in Garo. The term was first used by manga critic Tomofusa Kure in order to describe Garo's influence on the style of mainstream seinen manga published in magazines like Afternoon and Morning in the 1980s and 1990s.

Garo influence both within the manga business and in Japanese society as a whole has been considerable. Many manga artists who got their start in Garo went on to do much higher-profile work elsewhere, and several films have been produced based on stories that originally ran in Garo. Contemporary graphic design in Japan owes much to Garo artists, particularly King Terry, Seiichi Hayashi, and Shigeru Tamura. Retrospectives on the magazine have appeared in mainstream non-manga magazines, and in 1994 the Kawasaki city museum had a special exhibit of work by Garo alumni.

Garo in English
For the most part, commercial manga translators have passed over the offbeat works showcased in Garo in favor of more mainstream, action/adventure and romance stories from the major publishers. Similarly, scanlation translators have mostly overlooked experimental fare. However, some Garo comics are available in English.

In 2008 Drawn & Quarterly published Good-Bye, the third volume of their ongoing edition of the work of Yoshihiro Tatsumi. Some of the comics collected in Good-Bye originally appeared in Garo. In 2010 an English version of the anthology AX was published by Top Shelf Productions under the title AX: alternative manga (edited by Sean Michael Wilson and former Garo editor Mitsuhiro Asakawa). It featured several of the creators who had previously appeared in Garo in its later years and received a high level of praise from critics.

Artists associated with Garo

 Shinichi Abe
 Suzy Amekane
 Nobuyoshi Araki
 Yoshikazu Ebisu
 Usamaru Furuya
 Kazuichi Hanawa
 Ikuko Hatoyama
 Seiichi Hayashi
 Hideshi Hino

 Yuji Kamosawa
 Susumu Katsumata
 King Terry
 Suehiro Maruo
 Hiroshi Masumura
 Shigeru Mizuki
 Shinji Nagashima
 Kiriko Nananan
 Nekojiru

 Takashi Nemoto
 Kyoko Okazaki
 Shoichi Sakurai
 Erica Sakurazawa
 Carol Shimoda
 Sanpei Shirato
 Hinako Sugiura
 Oji Suzuki
 Shigeru Tamura

 Yoshihiro Tatsumi
 Tadao Tsuge
 Yūko Tsuno
 Kuniko Tsurita
 Yoshiharu Tsuge
 Shungicu Uchida
 Muddy Wehara
 Hanako Yamada
 Murasaki Yamada

Published manga 

 Kamui by Shirato Sanpei (1964–1971)
Screw Style (Nejishiki) by Yoshiharu Tsuge (1968)
Trash Market by Tadao Tsuge (1968–1972)
Red Colored Elegy by Seiichi Hayashi (1970–1971)
A Single Match by Oji Suzuki
Talk To My Back by Murasaki Yamada (1981–1984)
 Minami-kun no Koibito by Shungicu Uchida (1986–1987)
Palepoli by Usamaru Furuya (1994–1996)

References

External links 

 Former official website of Garo (Japanese)
 Overview of Garo issues between 1964 and 1971 (Japanese)

Literature
Dreamland Japan: Writings on Modern Manga by Frederik L. Schodt
Introduction to Comics Underground Japan, edited by Kevin Quigley
Garo Manga: The First Decade, 1964–1973, by Ryan Holmberg (The Center for Book Arts, 2010)

1964 establishments in Japan
2002 disestablishments in Japan
Anime and manga magazines
Defunct magazines published in Japan
Monthly manga magazines published in Japan
Magazines established in 1964
Magazines disestablished in 2002
Ero guro
Gekiga